The 2020 United States House of Representatives election in Puerto Rico was held on November 3, 2020, to elect the Resident Commissioner of Puerto Rico, concurrently with the election of the Governor, the Senate, the House of Representatives, and the mayors of the 78 municipalities. Incumbent New Progressive Party resident commissioner Jenniffer González, was re-elected to a second term in office.

The Resident Commissioner of Puerto Rico is the only member of the United States House of Representatives who is elected every four years instead of a two-year term.

New Progressive Party
On November 3, 2019, incumbent resident commissioner Jenniffer González announced that she would run for a second term for the office of resident commissioner.

Nominee 
Jenniffer González, Incumbent Resident Commissioner

Popular Democratic Party
On December 10, 2019, former governor Aníbal Acevedo Vilá announced that he would run for a second non-consecutive term for resident commissioner. His first term was from 2001 to 2005. He became the official nominee on January 31, 2020, after his opponent José Nadal Power did not receive enough endorsements to officialize his candidacy.

Nominee 
Aníbal Acevedo Vilá, Former governor

Puerto Rican Independence Party
On December 27, 2019, the Puerto Rican Independence Party nominated Dr. Luis Roberto Piñero for resident commissioner.

Nominee 
Luis Roberto Piñero, Pediatrist

Citizen's Victory Movement
On February 5, 2020, the party had a general assembly, where Dr. Zayira Jordán Conde was chosen as the candidate for resident commissioner.

Nominee 
Zayira Jordán Conde, Cyber security expert and Entrepreneur

Project Dignity
On May 24, 2020, gubernatorial candidate Dr. César Vázquez announced that attorney Ada Norah Henriquez would run for the party.

Nominee 
Ada Norah Henriquez, Attorney at law

Polling

with Generic Project Dignity

Results

Notes

References

External links
Official campaign websites
 Aníbal Acevedo Vilá (PPD / D) for Resident Commissioner
 Jenniffer González (PNP / R) for Resident Commissioner
 Zayira Jordán Conde (MVC) for Resident Commissioner 
 Ada Norah Henriquez (PD) for Resident Commissioner

Puerto Rico
2020
House